Marta Victoria Moya Peggo Burges (23 February 1931 – 27 June 2020), known professionally as Linda Cristal, was an Argentinian actress. She appeared in a number of Western films during the 1950s, before winning a Golden Globe Award for her performance in the 1958 comedy film The Perfect Furlough.

From 1967 to 1971, Cristal starred as Victoria Cannon in the NBC series The High Chaparral. For her performance she won the Golden Globe Award for Best Actress – Television Series Drama in 1970, and received two Emmy Award nominations.

Early years
Rumored to be the daughter of a French father and an Italian mother (however, documents indicate they were Spanish: Antonio Moya and Rosario P.), Cristal was born in Rosario, Santa Fe, Argentina on 23 February 1931. Her father was a publisher who moved the family to Montevideo, Uruguay due to political issues. She was educated at the Conservatorio Franklin in Uruguay.

Career

Cristal appeared in films in Argentina and Mexico before taking on her first English-language role as Margarita in the 1956 Western film Comanche. Following her Golden Globe Award for New Star of the Year in The Perfect Furlough (1958), Cristal went on to roles in Cry Tough (1959), Legions of the Nile (1959), The Pharaohs' Woman (1960), and was asked by John Wayne to play the part of Flaca in his epic The Alamo (1960). In 1961 she had a key role in the western Two Rode Together.

Along with these and other film roles, Cristal appeared in episodes of network television series. She played a kidnapped Countess opposite Eric Fleming and Clint Eastwood in a 1959 episode of Rawhide. She also had a role as a female matador in NBC's The Tab Hunter Show. She also appeared in a 1964 episode, "City Beneath the Sea", on Voyage to the Bottom of the Sea and numerous other television episodes.

Cristal semi-retired in 1964 to raise her two children. She was coaxed out of retirement when she became the last cast member to be added as a regular on the NBC series The High Chaparral (1967-1971). Her performance in the series, as Victoria Cannon, earned her two more Golden Globe nominations (winning Best Actress – Television Drama in 1968) and two Emmy Award nominations.

Cristal worked sparingly after The High Chaparral, with a few television and film roles, such as the film Mr. Majestyk (1974) and the television miniseries Condominium (1980).  She last appeared in the starring role of Victoria "Rossé" Wilson on the Argentine television series Rossé (1985).

Personal life
Cristal's 1950 marriage was annulled after five days. On 24 April 1958, in Pomona, California, she married Robert Champion, a businessman. They divorced on 9 December 1959. In 1960, she married Yale Wexler, a former actor who worked in real estate. They divorced in December 1966.

Cristal died at her home in Beverly Hills, California on 27 June 2020, aged 89.

Filmography

Film

Television

References

External links

 

1931 births
2020 deaths
Actresses from Rosario, Santa Fe
Argentine film actresses
Argentine emigrants to the United States
Argentine people of French descent
Argentine people of Italian descent
Western (genre) film actresses
Best Drama Actress Golden Globe (television) winners
New Star of the Year (Actress) Golden Globe winners
20th-century Argentine actresses
Expatriate actresses in the United States
Western (genre) television actors